Ahmed Rashid Beebeejaun, GCSK (born on 22 December 1934) is a former Deputy Prime Minister and Minister of Public Utilities of Mauritius. He was the Deputy leader of the Mauritian Labor Party and was the first person to hold office of Prime Minister in the Mauritius line of Succession during Navin Ramgoolam's tenure as Prime Minister. 

Navin Ramgoolam appointed Beebeejaun on 7 July 2005 as deputy prime minister after winning the 2005 general elections. He was born in Riviere du Rempart and was a doctor and practitioner in Mauritius before entering politics. In 2007 he was elevated to the rank of Grand Commander of the Star And Key of Indian Ocean by the then President of the country Sir Anerood Jugnauth.

Ahmed Rashid Beebeejaun graduated with a degree in medicine from the University of Birmingham and is a fellow of the Royal College of Physicians.

Beebeejaun was awarded an honorary DUniv by Birmingham University in 2011.

References

Members of the National Assembly (Mauritius)
Mauritian people of Indian descent
1935 births
Living people
Mauritian Muslims
Deputy Prime Ministers of Mauritius
Government ministers of Mauritius
Labour Party (Mauritius) politicians
Grand Commanders of the Order of the Star and Key of the Indian Ocean
Alumni of the University of Birmingham